Avni Akyol (1931, in Düzce – September 30, 1999 in Bolu), Turkish educator, politician, Minister of Culture and Minister of National Education.

Biography

In the general elections held in 1977, he became a Bolu deputy from the Justice Party (EP). Then II. The Ministry of Culture in the Nationalist Front Government. In 1986, the Council of Ministers was elected as a member of the Council of Higher Education. Participated in the Motherland Party founded in 1983. On March 30, 1989, Hasan Celal Güzel, the revised result of the Government of Ozal, became the Minister of National Education and continued the referendum and the three governments. (Özal Government, Akbulut Government, I. Yılmaz Government).
During the period, the idea of blue aprons was introduced and realized instead of navy blue aprons. Akyol has worked very hard to be the province of Düzce.
On December 24, 1995 he entered the Grand National Assembly of Turkey as a Bolu deputy and served as the Chairman of the Education Commission. After February 28, the ANASOL-D Government strived to put it directly into practice for the 8 year compulsory education decision. After the April 18, 1999 elections, parliament entered Bolu. He died of a heart attack in a hotel he had gone to for a funeral on September 30, 1999 in Bolu.

References

1931 births
1999 deaths
Turkish politicians
People from Düzce
Ministers of Culture of Turkey